Leskovac is a city in southern Serbia.

Leskovac may also refer to:

Places in Serbia
Leskovac (Zaječar), a village in the Zaječar municipality
Leskovac (Petrovac), a village in the Petrovac na Mlavi municipality 
Leskovac (Knić), a village in the Knić municipality
Leskovac (Lazarevac), a village in the Lazarevac municipality

People with the surname
Rachel Leskovac

See also
Leskovac Airport (disambiguation)

Leskovec (disambiguation)
Lyaskovets